Fahrenkrug is a municipality in the district of Segeberg, in Schleswig-Holstein, Germany. The two little villages Rotenhahn and Ziegelei belong also to Fahrenkrug. In the year 1192 has Varencroch, the old name of Fahrenkrug, been mentioned. In this text Varencroch was addicted to the monastery of Bad Segeberg. The name Varencroch means fern and corner, so that in the blazon of Fahrenkrug there are a fern and a corner.

In the prehistory of Fahrenkrug there settled humans. Next to stone axes and tools from the Stone Age, there was found significant finds in barrows Bronze Age, for example a golden ring.

References

Municipalities in Schleswig-Holstein
Segeberg